The Battle of Meung-sur-Loire took place on 15 June 1429.  It was one of Joan of Arc's battles following relief of the siege at Orléans. This campaign was the second sustained French offensive in a generation in the Hundred Years' War.

Background
Meung-sur-Loire (now in Loiret) was a small town on the northern bank of the Loire river in central France, slightly west of Orléans.  It controlled a bridge of strategic significance during the latter part of the war.  Captured by the English a few years earlier as a staging point for a planned invasion of southern France, the French offensive recaptured the bridge and hampered English movement south of the river during the campaign.

The French Loire Campaign of 1429 consisted of five actions:
1. The Siege of Orléans.
2. The Battle of Jargeau.
3. The Battle of Meung-sur-Loire.
4. The Battle of Beaugency.
5. The Battle of Patay.

Virtually all of France north of the Loire had fallen to foreign occupation by the end of 1428.  The bridge at Orléans had been destroyed shortly before the siege lifted. The French had lost control of all other river crossings.  Three swift and numerically small battles at Jargeau, Meung-sur-Loire, and Beaugency demonstrated renewed French confidence and laid the groundwork for subsequent French offenses on Rheims and Paris.  The Loire campaign killed, captured, or disgraced a majority of the top tier of English commanders and decimated the numbers of the highly skilled English longbowmen.

Tactics
English defenses at Meung-sur-Loire consisted of three components: the walled town, the fortification at the bridge, and a large walled castle just outside the town.  The castle served as headquarters to the English command of John Talbot, 1st Earl of Shrewsbury and Thomas Scales.

Joan of Arc and Duke John II of Alençon controlled a force that included captains Jean d'Orléans, Gilles de Rais, Jean Poton de Xaintrailles, and La Hire.  Estimates of numerical strength vary with the Journal du Siège d'Orléans citing 6,000 – 7,000  for the French.  A number that large probably counts non-combatants.  Bypassing the city and the castle, they staged a frontal assault on the bridge fortifications, conquered it in one day, and installed a garrison.  This hampered English movement south of the Loire.

Bibliography
 Devries, Kelly. Joan of Arc: A Military Leader (Gloucestershire: Sutton Publishing, 1999). 
 Richey, Stephen W. Joan of Arc: The Warrior Saint. (Westport, CT: Praeger, 2003). 
 Allmand, C. The Hundred Years War: England and France at War c. 1300 – 1450. (Cambridge: Cambridge University Press, 1988).

See also
Medieval warfare

References

External links
Joan of Arc And The Loire Valley Campaign history page
A Popular History of France from the Earliest Times by François Pierre Guillaume Guizot, vol. 3

1429 in England
1420s in France
Meung-sur-Loire 1429
History of Loiret
Meung-sur-Loire
Meung-sur-Loire 1429
Hundred Years' War, 1415–1453
Joan of Arc